Martin Harrison can refer to

Martin Harrison (American football) (born 1967), American football player
Martin Harrison (curator) (born 1945), curator of and writer about art and photography
Martin Harrison (poet) (1949–2014), Australian poet